Jean Dollimore is an English computer scientist that worked at Queen Mary University of London, notable for being co-author (together with George Coulouris, Tim Kindberg and Gordon Blair) of one of the standard distributed computer systems textbooks, Distributed Systems. This textbook alone has been cited over 4,700 times.

References

External links

Living people
Year of birth missing (living people)
Place of birth missing (living people)
English computer scientists
British women computer scientists
Academics of Queen Mary University of London
British textbook writers
Women textbook writers